Arwidsson is a Swedish surname. Notable people with the surname include:

Adolf Ivar Arwidsson (1791–1858), Finnish political journalist, writer, and historian
Greta Arwidsson (1906–1998), Swedish archaeologist

See also
Arvidsson

Swedish-language surnames